Uğur Dağdelen (3 October 1973 – 24 September 2015)  was a Turkish professional footballer from Amasya. He played for several clubs in Turkey in addition to the Turkey national football team.

Club career
Dağdelen played for Karabükspor, Bursaspor and Samsunspor in the Turkish Süper Lig, appearing in more than 140 league matches and scoring more than 30 goals.

International career
Dağdelen made one appearance for the full Turkey national football team in a friendly against Russia on April 22, 1998.

References

1973 births
2015 deaths
Turkish footballers
Turkey international footballers
Kardemir Karabükspor footballers
Bursaspor footballers
Samsunspor footballers
Kayseri Erciyesspor footballers
People from Amasya
Suicides in Turkey
Association football forwards
2015 suicides